St Mary's Church, Carlton-on-Trent is a Grade II* listed parish church in the Church of England in Carlton-on-Trent.

History

The church was built in 1851 to designs of the Nottingham architect, George Gordon Place. It is constructed in the Gothic Revival style.

It is part of a joint parish with:
St Matthew's Church, Normanton-upon-Trent
All Saints' Church, Sutton-on-Trent

Organ

The church contains an organ dating from 1925 by Samuel Wort. A specification of the organ can be found on the National Pipe Organ Register.

References

Church of England church buildings in Nottinghamshire
Grade II* listed churches in Nottinghamshire
Churches completed in 1851
1851 establishments in England